The Roswell Darius Bird Sr. House on South Main Street (Utah State Route 147) in Mapleton, Utah, United States was built in 1892. It was listed on the National Register of Historic Places in 1980.

The house has seven rooms.

In the 1980s the home was purchased by Mapleton City. In the 1990s early Mapleton Pioneer artifacts were collected by members of the Mapleton Historical Society. The artifacts were put on display in the home and the Mapleton Heritage Museum was created. The home is currently being used as the Mapleton Heritage Museum and home of the Mapleton Historical Society.

See also
 
 National Register of Historic Places listings in Utah County, Utah

References

External links

Houses completed in 1892
Houses on the National Register of Historic Places in Utah
Houses in Utah County, Utah
National Register of Historic Places in Utah County, Utah